Jay Schadler is a journalist, photographer and artist. Oprah Winfrey described Mr. Schadler like this: "Jay has the eyes of a journalist and the heart of a storyteller." For more than three decades Schadler traveled the world as a correspondent and anchor for ABC News, 20/20, Nightline, Good Morning America, National Geographic TV and others. He is currently a Keynote speaker. His talks about navigating life's transitions are laced with stories from his days on the road. (See Jay Schadler.com)   He previously  worked at WCVB in Boston, Massachusetts and KSTP in Minneapolis and WZZM (Grand Rapids, Mi) before joining ABC News in 1982.

Schadler is a graduate of Michigan State University. He graduated magna cum laude from the S.I. Newhouse School of Public Communications and also received a law degree from the Syracuse University College of Law.

"AMERICA'S HITCHHIKER"
Over the course of five years, Jay Schadler hitchhiked nearly 20,000 miles across America, interviewing and telling the stories of everyday people. Originally airing on ABC News' "Prime Time" the journeys were called "Looking for America. Later, with his longtime producer and friend, Robert Campos, the adventures
continued under the name "Talelights" for the Bravo Network. In 2000, Oprah Winfrey invited Mr. Schadler 
onto her show along with a handful of the people who picked him up along the road. Having helped pioneer the use of small video cameras and dash cams in cars, Mr.Schadler's hitchhiking stories are often cited as forerunners to the 'reality tv" explosion. "Looking for America" was nominated for an Emmy Award in 1996.

Justice Files
Jay formerly hosted Justice Files, a Discovery Channel series that discussed real-life crime cases and featured commentary by law professor Arthur Miller as well as reports that originally appeared on various ABC News productions.

References

External links
https://abcnews.go.com/Primetime/story?id=583107
http://www.jayschadler.com/ Official website

American television journalists
Television anchors from Boston
Michigan State University alumni
Syracuse University College of Law alumni
Living people
ABC News personalities
Place of birth missing (living people)
Year of birth missing (living people)
American male journalists
S.I. Newhouse School of Public Communications alumni